Delisi is a metro station on the Saburtalo Line in Tbilisi, Georgia. The station was known as Viktor Gotsiridze from 1992 to 2006. It has two entrances and is located at the intersection of Vazha-Pshavela avenue and Mikheil Tamarashvili street. The station and its surrounding area acts as a transport hub serving the upland settlements and areas of the Vake and Saburtalo districts with bus routes.

Modernization
As of 2022, EBRD and the Tbilisi Mayors Office announced that Delisi would have new entrances constructed, and the infrastructure of the station would be adapted for people with disabilities. The tender for this project is to be announced in May of 2023.

Gallery

References 

Railway stations opened in 1979
Tbilisi Metro stations
1979 establishments in Georgia (country)